Scandal Makers is a 2008 South Korean film written and directed by Kang Hyeong-cheol and starring Cha Tae-hyun, Park Bo-young and Wang Seok-hyeon. This was director Kang's first film and the highest grossing Korean film of the year. The film had Argentine, Chinese and Indian remakes, released in 2010, 2016 and 2020 respectively.

Plot
Former teen idol Nam Hyeon-soo (Cha Tae-hyun) is now in his thirties and works as a radio DJ. A young woman named Hwang Jeong-nam (Park Bo-young) sends stories about her life as a single mother to the radio station Hyeon-soo works at, telling him she is going to meet her father. He then finds out that he's her father when she shows up at his apartment with her son Ki-dong (Wang Seok-hyeon). She tells him that her real name is Jae-in and that her mother was Hyeon-soo's first love Jeong-nam. Hyeon-soo doesn't believe it at first, so they undergo a DNA test and the results confirm that they're related. Jae-in dreams of performing on stage as a singer, but Hyeon-soo fears that if she does, their paternity scandal might get out. Because of Jae-in's rising popularity, Ki-dong's father Park Sang-yoon (Im Ji-kyu) finds her. They meet and chat, with Sang-yoon initially under the mistaken assumption that Jae-in is romantically involved with Hyeon-soo. When Ki-dong later goes missing at Jae-in's performance, Hyeon-soo realizes that he really does care for his daughter and grandson. After news about his daughter and grandson got leaked, he wasn't faced with damage to his career due to taking responsibility of them in the first place, low popularity, and news about a disgraced film star beating up a scandal gossip journalist. With encouragement from Ki-Dong's kindergarten teacher, he changes his image to a responsible older man, which is warmly received by everyone. At a Christmas recital, Sang-yoon reconciles with Jae-in and Ki-Dong, rekindling their love for each other.

Cast
Cha Tae-hyun as Nam Hyeon-soo
Cha Soo-chan, Cha Tae-hyun's son and first child, appeared as a cameo at the last scene of the film. He was one year old at the time of filming.
Park Bo-young as Hwang Jeong-nam/Hwang Jae-in, Hyeon-soo's daughter
Wang Seok-hyeon as Hwang Ki-dong, Jae-in's son
Im Ji-kyu as Park Sang-yoon, Jae-in's first love and Ki-dong's birth father
Hwang Woo-seul-hye as Kindergarten teacher/Granny
Im Seung-dae as Bong Pil-joong, entertainment reporter
Jeong Won-joong as Bureau director
Kim Ki-bang as Director
Park Yeong-seo as Assistant director
Sung Ji-ru as Lee Chang-hoon (cameo)
 Go Jun as Commercial film director

Release
Scandal Makers was released in South Korea on 3 December 2008, and topped the box office on its opening weekend with 473,725 admissions. It continued to chart well finishing with over 8 million tickets sold becoming the highest grossing Korean film of 2008.  The second highest grosser was The Good, The Bad, The Weird with 6.6 million tickets, then The Chaser with roughly 5 million tickets sold.

Awards and nominations

Remakes 
 A Chinese remake titled Scandal Maker, directed by Ahn Byeong-ki and starring Tong Dawei and Michelle Chen was released in China on November 11, 2016.
A Vietnamese remake titled  was released on March 30, 2018.
An Indonesian remake titled Scandal Makers was released in Amazon Prime Video on January 19, 2023.

References

External links
 

Variety review
LoveHKFilm review
Far East Film review

2008 films
2000s Korean-language films
South Korean comedy-drama films
Films directed by Kang Hyeong-cheol
South Korean films remade in other languages
Films about single parent families
2000s South Korean films